Dustin Kimura (born May 21, 1989) is an American mixed martial artist, who formerly competed in the Bantamweight division of the Ultimate Fighting Championship.

Background
Kimura went to Kalani High School and then attended Honolulu Community College for Welding Technology. Dustin currently trains at Gracie Technics Honolulu.

MMA career

Early career
Kimura compiled a 9–0 professional record before signing with the UFC.

Ultimate Fighting Championship
Kimura made his promotional debut against Chico Camus on February 2, 2013 at UFC 156. He won the fight via submission in the third round.

In his second fight with the promotion, Kimura faced Mitch Gagnon on September 21, 2013 at UFC 165. He lost the fight via submission, resulting in the first loss of his professional MMA career.

Kimura faced promotional newcomer Jon Delos Reyes on January 4, 2014 at UFC Fight Night 34. He won the fight via submission in the first round.

Kimura faced George Roop on April 16, 2014 at The Ultimate Fighter Nations Finale. He lost the fight via unanimous decision.

Kimura was expected to face Ian Entwistle on September 5, 2014 at UFC Fight Night 50.  However, Entwistle pulled out of the bout citing an injury.  Subsequently, Kimura was paired with Chris Beal at the event.  In turn, Kimura also pulled out of the bout and was replaced by Tateki Matsuda.

Kimura faced promotional newcomer Henry Cejudo on December 13, 2014 at UFC on Fox 13. He lost the fight by unanimous decision, and was subsequently released from the promotion shortly after.

Mixed martial arts record

|-
|Loss
|align=center|11–3
|Henry Cejudo
|Decision (unanimous)
|UFC on Fox: dos Santos vs. Miocic
|
|align=center|3
|align=center|5:00 
|Phoenix, Arizona, United States
|
|-
|Loss
|align=center|11–2
|George Roop
|Decision (unanimous)
|The Ultimate Fighter Nations Finale: Bisping vs. Kennedy
|
|align=center|3 
|align=center|5:00 
|Quebec City, Quebec, Canada
|
|-
|Win
|align=center|11–1
|Jon delos Reyes
|Submission (armbar)
|UFC Fight Night: Saffiedine vs. Lim
|
|align=center|1
|align=center|2:13
|Marina Bay, Singapore
|
|-
|Loss
|align=center|10–1
|Mitch Gagnon
|Technical Submission (guillotine choke)
|UFC 165
|
|align=center|1
|align=center|4:05
|Toronto, Ontario, Canada
|
|-
|Win
|align=center|10–0
|Chico Camus
|Submission (rear-naked choke)
|UFC 156
|
|align=center|3
|align=center|1:50
|Las Vegas, Nevada, United States
|
|-
|Win
|align=center|9–0
|Guy Delumeau
|KO (punch)
|Pacific Xtreme Combat 34
|
|align=center|3
|align=center|4:44
|Quezon City, Philippines
|
|-
|Win
|align=center|8–0
|Damaso Pereira
|TKO (punches)
|Destiny MMA - Na Koa 1
|
|align=center|2
|align=center|1:48
|Honolulu, Hawaii, United States
|
|-
|Win
|align=center|7–0
|Toby Misech
|Submission (rear-naked choke)
|King of the Cage: Ali'is
|
|align=center|1
|align=center|4:07
|Honolulu, Hawaii, United States
|
|-
|Win
|align=center|6–0
|Eddie Perrells
|Submission (achilles lock)
|X-1 and Destiny - Crossfire
|
|align=center|1
|align=center|2:49
|Wailuku, Hawaii, United States
|
|-
|Win
|align=center|5–0
|Kurrent Cockett
|Submission (armbar)
|X-1 - Champions 3
|
|align=center|1
|align=center|2:58
|Wailuku, Hawaii, United States
|
|-
|Win
|align=center|4–0
|Sadhu Bott
|Decision (unanimous)
|X-1 - Island Pride
|
|align=center|3
|align=center|5:00
|Wailuku, Hawaii, United States
|
|-
|Win
|align=center|3–0
|Chris Willems
|Submission (triangle choke)
|X-1 - Heroes
|
|align=center|1
|align=center|2:55
|Wailuku, Hawaii, United States
|
|-
|Win
|align=center|2–0
|Spencer Higa
|Submission (guillotine choke)
|X-1 - Nations Collide
|
|align=center|2
|align=center|0:57
|Wailuku, Hawaii, United States
|
|-
|Win
|align=center|1–0
|Jake Noble
|Submission (rear-naked choke)
|Destiny MMA - Maui No Ka'oi
|
|align=center|2
|align=center|1:20
|Wailuku, Hawaii, United States
|
|-

Amateur mixed martial arts record 

|-
| Win
|align=center| 3–0
| Jon Barnard
| Submission (rear-naked choke)
| Destiny MMA - Bad Blood
| 
|align=center| 1
|align=center| N/A
| Waipahu, Hawaii, United States
|
|-
| Win
|align=center| 2–0
| Vernon Perengit
| Submission (rear-naked choke)
| Destiny MMA - The 2nd Coming
| 
|align=center| 2
|align=center| 1:02
| Waipahu, Hawaii, United States
|
|-
| Win
|align=center| 1–0
| Elijah Manners
| Decision (unanimous)
| X-1 - Fight Club Meets Night Club 5
| 
|align=center| 2
|align=center| 3:00
| Honolulu, Hawaii, United States
|

References

External links
 
 

1989 births
American male mixed martial artists
Living people
Mixed martial artists from Hawaii
Bantamweight mixed martial artists
Featherweight mixed martial artists
American sportspeople of Japanese descent
Ultimate Fighting Championship male fighters
Honolulu Community College alumni